Neolovricia is a genus of ground beetles in the family Carabidae. This genus has a single species, Neolovricia ozimeci. It is found in Croatia.

References

Trechinae
Monotypic Carabidae genera